The members of the 27th Manitoba Legislature were elected in the Manitoba general election held in December 1962. The legislature sat from February 28, 1963, to May 18, 1966.

The Progressive Conservative Party led by Duff Roblin formed the government.

Gildas Molgat of the Liberal Party was Leader of the Opposition.

James Bilton served as speaker for the assembly.

There were five sessions of the 27th Legislature:

Errick Willis was Lieutenant Governor of Manitoba until November 1, 1965, when Richard Spink Bowles became lieutenant governor.

Members of the Assembly 
The following members were elected to the assembly in 1962:

Notes:

By-elections 
By-elections were held to replace members for various reasons:

Notes:

References 

Terms of the Manitoba Legislature
1963 establishments in Manitoba
1966 disestablishments in Manitoba